Coutras is a railway station in Coutras, Nouvelle-Aquitaine, France. The station is located on the Paris - Bordeaux and Coutras - Tulle railway lines. The station is served by TER (local) services operated by SNCF.

Train services

The station is served by regional trains to Bordeaux, Angoulême, Périgueux, Limoges and Brive-la-Gaillarde.

References

Railway stations in Gironde
Railway stations in France opened in 1852